Juha Tapani Bagge (born October 2, 1962, in Kerava) is a Finnish author. He began writing full in 1983, and has published multiple novels, plays, comic scripts, radio plays, as well as television series scripts. He has also translated a large number of crime novels.

Works

Crime Novels
Hämeenlinna noir
 
 
 
 
 
 
 
 
 

Väinö Mujunen
 
 
 
 

Onni Syrjänen
 
 

Elviira Noir
 
 
 

Others

Other books

Short story collection

Young adult books
Aki Korhonen
 
 

Etsivätoimisto Musta koira
 
 
 

Juha & Ola
 
 
 
 
 

Others

Children's books
Aleksi
 
 
 

Urho
 
 
 
 
 
 
 

Kaisa
 
 
 
 
 
 
 
 
 
 

Apassit
 
 
 
 
 

Ukulele-etsivä Nina

Awards
 Häme Cultural Award 2005
 Arvid Lydecken Award for 2005's children's book In the Village
 Pertsa and Kilu Award 2006
 The Lead Award 2007 of detective novels Black Sky

External links
 Helenski City Library's Article on the Author
 Time for Words Article
 Library Lane Interview
 Aristotle's Heel

Finnish writers
Living people
1962 births